Fingerpointing is a remix album by the experimental rock band Red Krayola, released on July 22, 2008, by Drag City. It is a remix of the album Fingerpainting, with Jim O'Rourke responsible for the new mix.

Critical reception
Exclaim! praised O'Rourke's "striking use of space," writing that the producer "puts [Mayo] Thompson's voice and guitar low in the mix and lets a sparse array of skittering beats and synths carry the album."

Track listing

Personnel 
Frederick Barthelme
Steve Cunningham
David Grubbs
Bobby Henschen
George Hurley
Albert Oehlen
Jim O'Rourke
Stephen Prina
Elisa Randazzo
Mayo Thompson
Tom Watson
Sandy Yang

References

External links 
 

2008 remix albums
Drag City (record label) albums
Red Krayola albums